Pandemis is a genus of moths of the family Tortricidae and the tribe  Archipini.

Species
Pandemis acumipenita Liu & Bai, 1983
Pandemis canadana Kearfott, 1905
Pandemis capnobathra (Meyrick, 1930)
Pandemis caryocentra Diakonoff, 1960
Pandemis cataxesta Meyrick, 1937
Pandemis cerasana (Hübner, 1786)
Pandemis cerioschema (Meyrick, 1934)
Pandemis chlorograpta Meyrick, 1921
Pandemis chondrillana (Herrich-Schffer, 1860)
Pandemis cinnamomeana (Treitschke, 1830)
Pandemis corylana (Fabricius, 1794)
Pandemis croceocephala (Diakonoff, 1960)
Pandemis croceotacta (Diakonoff, 1960)
Pandemis crocograpta (Meyrick, 1933)
Pandemis curvipenita Liu & Bai, 1982
Pandemis dispersa (Diakonoff, 1960)
Pandemis dryoxesta Meyrick, 1920
Pandemis dumetana (Treitschke, 1835)
Pandemis electrochroa (Diakonoff, 1977)
Pandemis emptycta Meyrick, 1937
Pandemis euryloncha (Diakonoff, 1973)
Pandemis eustropha (Bradley, 1965)
Pandemis fulvastra Bai, 1994
Pandemis griveaudi (Diakonoff, 1960)
Pandemis heparana ([Denis & Schiffermuller], 1775)
Pandemis ianus (Diakonoff, 1970)
Pandemis ignescana (Kuznetsov, 1976)
Pandemis inouei Kawabe, 1968
Pandemis isotetras (Meyrick, 1934)
Pandemis lamprosana (Robinson, 1869)
Pandemis lichenosema (Diakonoff, 1970)
Pandemis limitata (Robinson, 1869)
Pandemis marginumbra (Diakonoff, 1960)
Pandemis metallochroma (Diakonoff, 1948)
Pandemis minuta (Diakonoff, 1960)
Pandemis monticolana Yasuda, 1975
Pandemis niphostigma (Diakonoff, 1960)
Pandemis oculosa (Diakonoff, 1960)
Pandemis orophila (Bradley, 1965)
Pandemis pauliani (Diakonoff, 1960)
Pandemis perispersa (Diakonoff, 1970)
Pandemis phaedroma Razowski, 1978
Pandemis phaenotherion Razowski, 1978
Pandemis phaiopteron Razowski, 1978
Pandemis piceocola Liu, 1990
Pandemis plutosema (Diakonoff, 1960)
Pandemis pyrusana Kearfott, 1907
Pandemis quadrata Liu & Bai, 1983
Pandemis rectipenita Liu & Bai, 1982
Pandemis refracta (Diakonoff, 1960)
Pandemis regalis (Diakonoff, 1960)
Pandemis retroflua (Diakonoff, 1960)
Pandemis rotundata (Diakonoff, 1960)
Pandemis sclerophylla (Diakonoff, 1960)
Pandemis stalagmographa (Diakonoff, 1960)
Pandemis stipulaceana (Mabille, 1900)
Pandemis straminocula (Diakonoff, 1960)
Pandemis striata Bai, 1994
Pandemis subovata (Diakonoff, 1970)
Pandemis tarda (Diakonoff, 1963)
Pandemis thomasi Razowski, 2006
Pandemis xanthacra (Diakonoff, 1960)
Pandemis xylophyes (Diakonoff, 1960)

See also
List of Tortricidae genera

References

 , 2005: World Catalogue of Insects volume 5 Tortricidae.
 , [1825] 1816, Verz. bekannter Schmett. 388.
 , 1990: Three new species of tortricids on Picea. Forest Research 3 (2): 137-140. Full article: .
 , 1982: Notes on chinese Pandemis Hübner (Lepidoptera: Tortricidae), with descriptions of two new species. Acta Zootaxonomica Sinica 7 (2): 196-202.
 , 1983: Two new species of chinese Pandemis Hübner (Lepidoptera: Tortricidae). Zoological Research 4 (3): 235-237. Full article: .

External links
tortricidae.com

 

Tortricidae genera